Fabio Rinaldi is a research scientist at the IDSIA, Switzerland. Until 2019 he was a researcher and group leader at the University of Zurich.

He is also a group leader at the Swiss Institute of Bioinformatics (SIB), and a visiting scientist at the Center for Genomic Sciences  (UNAM, Mexico), where he collaborates with the RegulonDB group.

He is the initiator and team leader of the OntoGene research group, which focuses on Text Mining for biomedical applications.

Dr. Rinaldi is a very active contributor to the field of biomedical text mining.
He is one of the co-organizers of the well-known BioCreative challenges on evaluation of biomedical text mining technologies.

Notes

External links
 profile at IDSIA
 profile at the University of Zurich

Living people
Year of birth missing (living people)
Place of birth missing (living people)
Academic staff of the University of Zurich
Swiss biologists
Bioinformaticians